is a Kitakyushu monorail station in Kokura Kita-ku, Kitakyūshū, Fukuoka Prefecture, Japan.

History
The station opened on 9 January 1985 as Kokura Station, and was renamed to the current name on 1 April 1998 when the monorail was extended 400 metres and connected to Kokura Station.

Station layout
The elevated station has an island platform with two tracks.

Platforms

References

Railway stations in Japan opened in 1985